Bagh-e Sofla (also Romanized as Bāgh-e Soflá; also known as Bāgh-e Jāydar-e Soflá and Bāgh) is a village in Jayedar Rural District, in the Central District of Pol-e Dokhtar County, Lorestan Province, Iran. At the 2006 census, its population was 215, in 41 families.

References 

Towns and villages in Pol-e Dokhtar County